Events from the year 1506 in England.

Incumbents
 Monarch – Henry VII
 Lord Chancellor – William Warham
 Lord Privy Seal – Richard Foxe
 Secretary of State – Thomas Ruthall

Events
16 January – Philip of Burgundy lands at Melcombe Regis after the fleet carrying him to Castile runs into a violent storm
9 February and 20 March – Treaties of Windsor ally England, Burgundy, and the Habsburgs against France. These are signed by Philip while held by Henry VII at Windsor Castle
24 April – After being extradited to England as part of Henry's agreement with Philip, Edmund de la Pole is imprisoned in the Tower of London as a rival claimant to the throne.

Births
 4 December – Thomas Darcy, Courtier (died 1558)
Elizabeth Barton, nun (died 1534)
Margaret Lee, confidante of Queen Anne Boleyn (died 1543)
William Paget, 1st Baron Paget, statesman (died 1563)

Deaths
 6 September – Sir Richard Guildford, courtier (born 1450)
 8 November – Edward Hastings, 2nd Baron Hastings (born 1466)

References

 
Years of the 16th century in England